Reshmi Boban is an Indian actress known for her performance in Malayalam films and television series.

Television career

TV serials

TV shows
 2013: Sreekandan Nair Show as Panelist
 2014: Ruchibhedham (ACV) as Presenter
 2014: Surya Challenge (Surya TV) as Participant
       Malayali Darbar (Amrita TV) as Panelist
 2019: Paisa Paisa (Kerala Vision) as Participant
 2020: Singing Chef (Surya TV) as Host
 2021: Bzinga (Zee Keralam) as Participant
 2022: Red Carpet (Amrita TV) as Mentor
 2022: Flowers Oru Kodi [Flowers] as Participant
 2022: Start Music Aaradhyam Padum Season 4 (Asianet) as Participant
 2022: Parayam Nedam (Amrita TV) as Participant

Filmography

References

External links
 

Indian film actresses
Actresses in Malayalam television
Indian television actresses
Living people
20th-century Indian actresses
21st-century Indian actresses
Actresses in Malayalam cinema
Year of birth missing (living people)
Place of birth missing (living people)
Actresses in Hindi cinema